Please Stand By is a 2017 American comedy-drama film directed by Ben Lewin and based on the 2008 short play of the same name by Michael Golamco, who also wrote the screenplay. The film stars Dakota Fanning, Toni Collette, Alice Eve, River Alexander and Patton Oswalt, and was distributed by Magnolia Pictures. After playing at various film festivals, the film was simultaneously released theatrically and on-demand on January 26, 2018.

Plot 
Wendy—a brilliant autistic young woman who has a fixation on Star Trek—lives a routine life in a San Francisco group home where she is monitored by the house manager, Scottie. She spends her time writing a 450-page Star Trek script to enter in Paramount Pictures' screenwriting contest in hopes of winning the $100,000 prize. Wendy is visited by her sister Audrey, who shows Wendy pictures of her infant daughter, Ruby, and reveals that she is selling their childhood home. Wendy asks Audrey to take her home, arguing that she will be able to buy back the house and help Audrey care for Ruby once she wins the screenwriting contest. Audrey refuses, informing Wendy she isn't capable of caring for a baby. Unfortunately, Wendy has a meltdown and Audrey leaves the group home weeping.

After Wendy misses the mail-in date to send her script to Paramount Pictures, she decides to deliver the script herself. She leaves the group home early the next morning and is followed by the group home's small dog, Pete. Wendy and Pete board a bus to Los Angeles, but are kicked off and left by the side of the road after Pete urinates on the bus. Wendy then wanders into a shanty town, where she is robbed of most of her money. She then wanders to a nearby shop and is nearly swindled out of the last of her money by an employee. An elderly woman named Rose intervenes to stop the employee from exploiting Wendy. Rose sympathizes with Wendy as her grandson is also autistic, and lets Wendy accompany her on the senior citizens' bus. The bus driver subsequently falls asleep at the wheel, crashing the bus without warning.

Following the bus crash, Wendy wakes up in a hospital in Bakersfield. Still determined to deliver her script as planned, Wendy leaves Pete at the hospital and escapes. During her escape, Wendy loses part of her script by chance. She gathers used paper and begins rewriting the script. Simultaneously, Audrey and Scottie have realized Wendy is missing. They begin to search for her and file a missing persons report. After correctly deducing that Wendy left for Los Angeles to personally deliver her script, Scottie and her son Sam leave on the road. The Bakersfield hospital notifies Scottie and Audrey of Wendy's whereabouts; police continue the search from there. Scottie and Sam find the missing script pages while scouring the hospital.

Wendy then attempts to buy a bus ticket to Los Angeles, but is unable as she has no money. She ultimately stows away on the next bus to Los Angeles, hiding herself inside a baggage compartment. Upon her arrival in Los Angeles, Wendy wanders around until two police officers recognize her from the missing persons report. Fortunately, Officer Frank gains Wendy's trust by speaking to her in Klingon. The officers bring Wendy to the police station, where she is reunited with Audrey and Scottie. They bring Wendy to Paramount Pictures so she can deliver her script as planned.

Despite being stonewalled by a bad-mannered mailroom worker, Wendy is able to sneak past security and submit the script to the turn-in box. Satisfied that she has completed her mission, Wendy informs her sister she did this to prove that she was more capable than Audrey thought. Wendy returns to the group home where she later receives a letter from Paramount Pictures informing her that her script was not chosen, but encouraging her to continue writing. Despite the rejection from the movie studio, she is satisfied with everything she has accomplished. Wendy visits Audrey at their childhood home and holds her niece in her arms for the first time, while Audrey embraces Wendy.

Cast

Release
It had its world premiere at the Austin Film Festival on October 27, 2017. It was theatrically released on January 26, 2018 and on VOD by Magnolia Home Entertainment on May 1, 2018.

Reception

Box office
Please Stand By grossed $9,868 in the United States and Canada, and $396,864 in other territories, for a worldwide total of $406,732. Sales of its DVD/Blu-ray releases have grossed an estimated $145,291.

Critical response
On review aggregator Rotten Tomatoes, the film holds an approval rating of 58% based on 38 reviews, and an average rating of 5.86/10. The website's critical consensus reads, "Please Stand By hits a number of familiar coming-of-age beats, but adds just enough of a Trek-fueled twist to keep things interesting." On Metacritic, the film has a weighted average score of 49 out of 100, based on 12 critics, indicating "mixed or average reviews".

References

External links
 
 
 

2017 films
2017 comedy-drama films
2017 independent films
2010s American films
2010s English-language films
2010s coming-of-age comedy-drama films
American coming-of-age comedy-drama films
American films based on plays
Films about autism
Films about disability
Films about runaways
Films about sisters
Films directed by Ben Lewin
Films scored by Heitor Pereira
Films set in San Francisco
Films set in Los Angeles
Star Trek fandom
Works about Star Trek